Lake Wylie is a census-designated place (CDP) in York County, South Carolina, United States. The population was 8,841 at the 2010 census. Lake Wylie is located on a peninsula along the shore of Lake Wylie, a reservoir that was named for Dr. W. Gil Wylie in 1960. It is a suburb of Charlotte, North Carolina.

Geography
Lake Wylie is located on a peninsula along the shore of Lake Wylie in the Piedmont of both North and South Carolina, at  (35.105973, -81.056978). The average elevation of the town is 512 feet.

As a result of the community's proximity to the state line between North and South Carolina, it has been significantly affected by recent efforts to resurvey the state line using modern global positioning system technology. The process moved the state line approximately  southward in the Lake Wylie area, resulting in several properties in the community now being located in South Point Township in North Carolina — including one property where the new state line falls between the owner's house and his back deck, and a gas station and convenience store whose owner has noted that differences in gas prices and retail regulations between the two states will probably force him out of business.

The Post Office considers much of the CDP to be unincorporated Clover.

Climate
Lake Wylie has a humid subtropical climate, characterized by humid summers and cool dry winters. Precipitation does not vary greatly by amount between seasons with snow, rain, and sleet in the winter months and mostly rain in the summer months with occasional hail from strong thunderstorms. The coldest month of the year is January, when the average high temperature is below  and the average low temperature is below .

Demographics

2020 census

As of the 2020 United States census, there were 13,655 people, 4,869 households, and 3,894 families residing in the CDP.

2010 census
At the 2010 census, there were 8,841 people, 1,458 households and 1,039 families residing in the CDP. The racial make-up was 97.68% White, 1.05% African American, 0.26% Native American, 0.75% Asian, 0.07% from other races and 0.02% from two or more races. Hispanic or Latino of any race were 0.82% of the population.

There were 1,458 households, of which 16.5% had children under the age of 18 living with them, 66.3% were married couples living together, 3.8% had a female with no husband present, and 28.7% were non-families. 24.5% of all households were made up of individuals, and 8.2% had someone living alone who was 65 years of age or older. The average household size was 2.10 and the average family size was 2.47.

13.5% of the population were under the age of 18, 4.4% from 18 to 24, 21.9% from 25 to 44, 36.9% from 45 to 64, and 23.4% who were 65 years of age or older. The median age was 51 years. For every 100 females, there were 98.0 males. For every 100 females age 18 and over, there were 96.8 males.

The median household income was $76,819 and the median family income was $88,208. Males had a median income of $50,208 and females $32,679. The per capita income was $43,567. None of the families and 0.8% of the population were living below the poverty line, including no under eighteens and none of those over 64.

Lake Wylie's population grew to around 12,000 during the 2010s as younger families were drawn there from all over the U.S. by low tax rates and the local schools. As a result, local infrastructure such as the roads and the water supply system were stressed by the demand, with traffic congestion regularly occurring on local roads and frequent boil-water advisories. York County has declared a moratorium on all new construction in order to better plan the area's development.

Education
Lake Wylie has a public library, a branch of the York County Library.

The CDP is part of York County School District 2 (Clover School District).

See also
 Buster Boyd Bridge
 Tega Cay

References

External links
 Lake Wylie Chamber of Commerce

Census-designated places in South Carolina
Census-designated places in York County, South Carolina